Austin Melford (1884—1971) was a British screenwriter and film director. He was the older brother of actor Jack Melford.

Partial filmography

Director
 Car of Dreams (1935)
 Oh, Daddy! (1935)
 Radio Lover (1936)

Screenwriter
 It's a Boy (1933)
 Night of the Garter (1933)
 A Southern Maid (1933)
 Aunt Sally (1933)
 Road House (1934)
 Heat Wave (1935)
 Three Maxims (1936)
 It's Love Again (1936)
 Jack of All Trades (1936)
 Feather Your Nest (1937)
 Keep Fit (1937)
 School for Husbands (1937)
 The Girl in the Taxi (1937)
 The Show Goes On (1937)
 The Mill on the Floss (1937)
 I See Ice (1938)
 Many Tanks Mr. Atkins (1938)
 The Good Old Days (1939) (lost)
 Murder Will Out (1939) (lost)
 His Brother's Keeper (1940)
 He Found a Star (1941)
 We'll Smile Again (1942)
 South American George (1943)
 Theatre Royal (1943)
 Champagne Charlie (1944)
 Don Chicago (1945)

References

External links

1884 births
1971 deaths
British film directors
British male screenwriters
20th-century British screenwriters